Vadodara Marathon is a run for charity or for purpose organized now annually/bi-annually by an organization based in Vadodara. Accredited to the Association of International Marathon and Distance Races (AIMS), the Vadodara Marathon is the recipient of the AIMS gold medal for 'smallest city, biggest Marathon'.

Past Marathons

2009 
Held on 22 November 2009, 31,800 people participated. Flagged off by Gujarat Chief Minister Narendra Modi in presence of Kapil Dev, Milkha Singh, Paresh Rawal, Yusuf Pathan, Irfan Pathan at Navalakhi Ground Vadodara.

2011 
Held on 23 January 2011, 30,000 people participated.  The event had 3 categories of run: 5 km, 15 km and 21 km; which was flagged off by Gujarat Chief Minister Narendra Modi. For the first time in India, Radio Frequency Identification (RFID) tags were given to each participant in the Marathons

2012 
Held on 5 February 2012.

2013 
Held on 15 December 2013, 12,000 people participated, including international runners.

2016 
Held on 7 February 2016, over 65,000 people registered in the various different categories. The race was flagged off by Gujarat chief minister Anandiben Patel.

2017 
Held on 5 February 2017, the race was flagged off by Gujarat Chief Minister Vijay Rupani.

2018 
Held on 7 January 2018, over 92,000 people registered in the various different categories. The race was flagged off by Gujarat Chief Minister Vijay Rupani.

2019 
Held on 6 January 2019, an estimated 100,000 people registered for the event. The race was flagged off by Chief Minister of Gujarat Vijay Rupani.

List of winners
Key:

References

See also

Marathons in India
Sport in Vadodara
2009 establishments in Gujarat
Recurring sporting events established in 2009